Mill Creek is a  long 3rd order tributary to the Deep River in Randolph County, North Carolina.

Course
Mill Creek rises in a pond about 2 miles northwest of Fox Mountain in Randolph County, North Carolina and then flows southwesterly to join the Deep River about 2 miles southwest of Parks Crossroads, North Carolina.

Watershed
Mill Creek drains  of area, receives about 47.3 in/year of precipitation, and has a wetness index of 406.69 and is about 48% forested.

References

Rivers of North Carolina
Rivers of Randolph County, North Carolina